Vicente Zorita Alonso (1920, Ponferrada - 14 November 1980) was a politician who was assassinated by the armed separatist group ETA, a candidate in the first elections to the Basque Parliament for People´s Alliance.

Biography 
Vicente Zorita Alonso was killed in the town of Santurce in Bizcay on 14 November 1980. He was on the third place on People´s Alliance list in the first elections to the Basque Parliament, in March 1980. He had been working for over 30 years as an administrative employee. He was married and had four children.

Murder 
On the night of 14 November 1980, the separatist group ETA kidnapped and killed Vicente Zorita. They forced him into a vehicle that had been stolen two hours earlier. Around 23:00 some young people found Vicente's body upside down, with his face covered, bleeding and riddled with bullets on a road near the district of Cabieces, also in Santurce. They informed the Municipal Police. After the arrival of the Municipal Police, the National Police went there, who gave notice to the judge. The body had at least seven bullet wounds, one of them in the head. The murderers left the body riddled with a Spanish flag inside his mouth like a gag. The investigations indicated that Vicente Zorita was machine-gunned in the back and then shot in the head. The victim had his personal documents with him, that was his People´s Alliance membership card. About 00:30 the body was lifted and being transferred in an ambulance to the deposit of the Civil Hospital of Basurto. At approximately 8:00 pm, a vehicle was stolen at gunpoint in the street of María Díaz de Haro from Portugalete a metallic blue Citroen CX Pallas. This vehicle was found, after being abandoned, in the neighbourhood of Buenavista, in Portugalete, at 3:00 in the morning of the following day.

No one was convicted of this attack. According to the Secretariat of Peace and Coexistence of the Basque Government, the procedural situation of the offence is on provisional dismissal.

The newspaper Egin affirmed the following day that the military ETA brand of Santurce claimed through an anonymous call the authorship of this attack shortly before 11:30 p.m. on the same day. The group claimed "to have interrogated him thoroughly and later, Vicente Zorita was killed". He also said: "we warned the members of Alianza Popular that of following Olarra with their position of not negotiating with their workers, within a week we will begin to execute members of A.P. for their identification with his ideological approaches. Therefore, we accuse them directly of the decisions taken by Olarra about it".

Four days after the attack, on 18 November 1980, Egin published a story that ETA had reaffirmed its authorship of this killing through a statement. In this statement, ETA's military insists that "they interrogated Vicente Zorita before they killed him "and warns" the Alianza Popular's group and the oligarchic sector to which he lends his political support so that they abandon their authoritarian position to blackmail, threaten and wield repressive strategies against the just claims of the class worker, and finally end by renouncing the policy of abuse and arbitrariness to which they are subjecting the movement worker and the politician of decapitalisation and economic chaos in which they want to flood the South Euskadi ".

His murder remains unsolved.

References

Bibliography 
 MERINO, A., CHAPA, A., Raíces de Libertad. pp. 83–91. FPEV (2011). 
 This article makes use of material translated from the corresponding article in the Spanish-language Wikipedia.

People's Party (Spain) politicians
People killed by ETA (separatist group)
Assassinated Spanish politicians
1920 births
1980 deaths